Senecio antandroi  is a species of the genus Senecio endemic to Madagascar.

References

External links

antandroi
Endemic flora of Madagascar